Club Deportivo Curacao was a Honduran football club that played in the Honduran Liga Nacional from 1988–89 to 1989–90.

They played their home games at Estadio Tiburcio Carías Andino.

Achievements
Segunda División
Winners (1): 1987–88
Runners-up (4): 1976, 1980, 1982, 1985

League performance

Top scorers
  Eduardo Bennett (13)
  Carlos Humberto Lobo (12)
  Francisco "Pancho" Gonzalez

References

Defunct football clubs in Honduras